Voice Elements is a Microsoft .NET development environment for building automated telephone systems.  Voice Elements was released by Inventive Labs Corporation in 2008, based on their original CTI32 toolkit.  Software developers who use C#, VB.NET or Delphi use Voice Elements to write telephony-based applications, such as Interactive Voice Response systems, voice dialers, auto attendants, call centers and more.

Voice Elements Software 
In addition to the Microsoft .NET Framework, Voice Elements supports the use of speech recognition, text-to-speech, Dialogic TDM hardware and the Inventive Labs HMP Elements SIP Platform.  Applications built with Voice Elements are deployed via Voice over IP, via the Inventive Labs cloud hosting service, or by traditional TDM, such as T1, E1 or analog phone lines.

Users of Voice Elements-based solutions interact by using Touch Tone (DTMF) input or with voice commands through speech recognition technology. In addition, developers may program with pre-recorded prompts or use text-to-speech.

Common applications that are built using Voice Elements include:

 Tele-Integrations
 Customer Self-Service IVRs
 Call Centers
 Phone Systems
 Ticket Management
 Two-Factor Authentication
 Customer Surveys
 Store Locators
 Appointment Reminders
 Voice/SMS Broadcasts
 Political Polling
 Power Dialer
 Reservation Confirmation
 Collections
 SMS Marketing
 Emergency Notifications 
 Order Status
 Delivery Reminders
 Flight Information
 Fundraising
 Alerts/Notifications

Typically, industries such as Health Care, Retail and Hospitality, and Financial Services use telephony applications to increase customer contact and automate tasks.

Visual Studio developers, by learning the Voice Elements classes, can create almost any voice application.  Call logging and sample inbound and outbound applications are a part of the software package.

If deployed via SIP, Voice Elements developers may use the highly tuned Call Progress Analysis that is included in the Inventive Labs SIP Platform.  Call Progress Analysis results inform the software if a person or machine answer a call, and are used in outbound dialing campaigns.

Voice Features

 SIP Call Control with its internally developed VoIP stack 
 Accurate Call Progress Analysis (CPA). (Detect Human or Machine)
 Beep Detection
 Speech Recognition
 Text To Speech (TTS) 
 Conferencing
 Faxing
 WebRTC for Agent / Customer connections
 Call Routing
 Call Recording
 Play / Record computer files
 Tone Recognition (DTMF / Custom Tones)
 Whisper / Coaching

WebRTC 
Voice Elements launched their WebRTC interface in August 2013 with their Voice Elements Platform 5.  It includes a simple API for creating browser-based, feature-rich WebRTC applications.

This new feature was premiered at the WebRTC Conference & Expo, Atlanta GA, June 25–27, 2013.

Awards 
 2011 Product of the Year awarded to Inventive Labs Corp for "Voice Elements with Excellent Call Progress Analysis" at TMC Internet Telephony Conference
 2012 Best of Show awarded to Inventive Labs Corp for "Best Development Tool" at TMC IT Expo, Austin, Texas.  Innovation on Display: ITEXPO Austin
 2012 Best of Show awarded to Inventive Labs Corp for "Best Development Tool" at TMC IT Expo, Miami, Florida.

References

.NET software